Coming to Power: Writings and Graphics on Lesbian S/M is a 1981 book edited by members of the lesbian feminist S/M organisation Samois. It is an anthology of lesbian S/M writings. It was a founding work of the lesbian BDSM movement.

It was quickly out-of-print and reached a worldwide audience the following year when it was reprinted by Alyson Publications. The book alternates short stories with advice on techniques, a model that has been used by various other BDSM books since then.

A sequel The Second Coming: A Leatherdyke Reader was published in 1996, edited by Pat Califia and Robin Sweeney.

Many of the authors in Coming to Power characterise sadomasochism as the epitome of eroticism.

It is described in Coming on Strong: Gay Politics and Culture as containing lesbian erotica.

References

BDSM literature
Queer theory
1981 books
Gender studies books
Feminist books
Lesbian erotica
Lesbian BDSM
1980s LGBT literature
LGBT literature in the United States